The eighth season of the American television comedy series The Goldbergs premiered with two back-to-back episodes on October 21, 2020. This is the final season with George Segal, who died on March 23, 2021.

In May 2021, the series was renewed for a ninth season.

Cast

Main cast
Wendi McLendon-Covey as Beverly Goldberg
Sean Giambrone as Adam Goldberg
Troy Gentile as Barry Goldberg
Hayley Orrantia as Erica Goldberg
Sam Lerner as Geoff Schwartz
George Segal as Albert "Pops" Solomon
Jeff Garlin as Murray Goldberg

Recurring cast
Carrie Wampler as Ren
Matt Bush as Andy Cogan
Noah Munck as Naked Rob
Shayne Topp as Matt Bradley
Sadie Stanley as Brea Bee
David Koechner as Bill Lewis
Jessica St. Clair as Dolores
Stephen Tobolowsky as Principal Earl Ball
Dan Bakkedahl as Mr. Woodburn
Steve Guttenberg as Dr. Katman
Jennifer Irwin as Virginia "Ginzy" Kremp
Mindy Sterling as Linda Schwartz
Stephanie Courtney as Essie Karp
Erinn Hayes as Jane Bales
Judd Hirsch as Ben "Pop Pop" Goldberg
Richard Kind as Michael "Formica Mike" Mikowitz
Cedric Yarbrough as Vic
Beth Triffon as Joanne Schwartz

Special guest stars
Brea Bee as Vicki Bee
AJ Michalka as Lainey Lewis

Episodes

Ratings

References

The Goldbergs (2013 TV series) seasons
2020 American television seasons
2021 American television seasons